The Atlantic Cup is both the name of the rivalry, as well as the trophy awarded to the winner of the regular season series between D.C. United, and the New York Red Bulls. The series occurs twice a year, with each team hosting one match. Although the Atlantic Cup is just one of the now many "I-95 Derbies" it is still considered by many Major League Soccer fans and pundits to be the original derby of the East Coast. 

Inaugurated in 2002, the Atlantic Cup has become one of the most bitter rivalries in Major League Soccer and in American soccer. The origins of the rivalry are unknown, but some claim that it developed due to the cities' relative proximity to each other, and the frequency with which the two clubs play one another in league, playoff, and Open Cup play. New York City and Washington, D.C. have had rivalries based on various other sports, such as American football (Giants–Washington rivalry) and ice hockey (Capitals–Rangers rivalry), so can also be argued that the rivalry that already existed between the two cities ended up being also transplanted for soccer. For United, the Red Bulls are the only opponent they have competed against in more than six occasions in both the U.S. Open Cup and the MLS Cup Playoffs.

Initially, the rivalry has been in favor of D.C. United, in terms of silverware collected and matches won. Over both clubs' histories, United has won a dozen major titles, while New York was the last original MLS franchise to win its first major title (in 2013). However, while the Atlantic Cup was dominated by D.C. United during a majority of the 2000s, New York dominated the series during a majority of the 2010s. As of August 6, 2022, the two sides have met 103 times across all competitions, 86 of them were in the MLS regular season, 13 in MLS Cup playoffs, and 4 in U.S. Open Cup.

The New York Red Bulls are the current titleholders of the Atlantic Cup.

The rivalry

Origins 

The two teams first met on May 12, 1996; when the New York Red Bulls were branded as the New York/New Jersey MetroStars. The game was played at RFK Stadium in front of a crowd of 14,722, and ended 1–1 in regulation time. In regulation time, United's John Harkes scored United's first ever goal against the MetroStars off an assist from Tony Sanneh in the 11th minute. The MetroStars' Giovanni Savarese drew the match level in the 62nd minute. At the time, if Major League Soccer ended drawn at the end of regulation time, it entered the 35-yard shootout. In the shootout, the MetroStars won the first match of the series 2–1.

During the inaugural regular season, the two sides would meet each other three more times, with the two sides sharing spoils. The 1996 season ended gridlocked with each club winning two matches apiece, winning one match in their home stadium, and another on the road. However, on aggregate goals, United outscored the MetroStars 6–4. The two sides met again in the Conference Semifinals 1996 MLS Cup Playoffs, where United defeated the MetroStars 2–1 in a best-of-three series. The first game of the post-season series, played on September 24, 1996, ended in the MetroStars' favor, as NY/NJ posted a victory in the shootout following a 2–2 tie after regulation. Three days later, United earned a 1–0 regulation victory at home, tying the series at 1–1, before culminating the series with a 2–1 victory, thanks to an 89th-minute penalty kick from Raul Diaz Arce. In the 1996 MLS Cup Playoffs, United would eventually go on to win the inaugural MLS Cup, defeating the Los Angeles Galaxy, 3–2.

By next year, the two franchises took opposite routes in MLS' sophomore campaign, with D.C. United eventually going on to win their second MLS Cup championship, while the NY/NJ MetroStars failed to qualify for the 1997 MLS Cup Playoffs altogether. Despite the poorer form from the MetroStars, the club won the regular season series against United, through the virtue of more aggregate goals.  The two sides faced off four times during the season, with United winning the first two outings, while the MetroStars won the final two meetings. In the final regular season matchup, held on September 27, 1997; United lost at home by a 3–1 scoreline against the MetroStars, ultimately failing to win the series.

Arrival of the formal cup 

At the start of the 2002 Major League Soccer season, a formal trophy was incarnated by the administrators of D.C. United and the MetroStars, which was titled the "Atlantic Cup". In the 2002 series, United earned the trophy, winning two of the three regular season outings against the MetroStars. Despite the success, neither team qualified for the 2002 MLS Cup Playoffs, being the only two teams in the league not to qualify that season.

During the 2003 Lamar Hunt U.S. Open Cup, the MetroStars and United both enjoyed successful Open Cup campaigns, meeting each other in the semifinal round of the Open Cup, marking the first time the two rivals met in the domestic tournament. In the quarterfinals, the MetroStars enjoyed a golden goal victory from an Amado Guevara goal in the 116th minute, defeating fellow MLS side, the New England Revolution, in the process. United faced USISL Pro League side (third division), Wilmington Hammerheads. The match, played in Wilmington, North Carolina, saw United emerge victorious 1–0 off a Ronald Cerritos goal in the 30th minute.

The October 1, 2003 Open Cup semifinal affair was hosted by the MetroStars and played on at Yurcak Field in Piscataway, New Jersey, marking the first time in Atlantic Cup history the two sides met at Yurcak.  In the outing, United got the go-ahead goal in the 18th minute of play off a strike from Galin Ivanov. Honduran international, Amado Guevara, netted two unanswered goals for the MetroStars in the 20th and 43rd minutes of play, giving the MetroStars a 2–1 lead going into the break. With less than 15 minutes remaining in regulation, United's Cerritos netted the equalizer, only before longtime MetroStars striker, John Wolyniec netted the match-winner, sending the MetroStars to their first ever championship of a major tournament.

Early club connections 

In addition, early in the history of the league, there were personality clashes between members of the two teams. For example, MetroStars players Tony Meola and Tab Ramos were long time acquaintances of D.C. United's captain John Harkes. All three players were natives of New Jersey and had played together and against each other most of their lives. DC fans especially singled out Meola (who was briefly an actor and who had tried out to be the placekicker for the New York Jets) for scorn. In response, MetroStars supporters tended to reserve most of their scorn for Richie Williams. Ironically, former D.C. assistant coach Bob Bradley would coach the MetroStars, and the Red Bulls coaching staff was also headed by former D.C. coach Bruce Arena until the end of the 2007 season, assisted by Harkes and Williams.

Red Bull controversy 

The rivalry became even greater when the two met at Giants Stadium on April 22, 2006 as Alecko Eskandarian scored the first goal of a 4–1 D.C. United victory. After the goal he took a sip of Red Bull energy drink and then spit it on the ground as an intentional slight on the recently renamed New York Red Bulls. MLS fined Eskandarian $250 for his actions.

Recent years 

Throughout the 2010 season, D.C. United hit an all-time nadir record wise, whereas the New York Red Bulls were making several high-profile acquisitions, causing some to believe that New York was becoming the more dominant Atlantic Cup team. On May 1, 2010; while United had lost their first four regular season matches, New York had won their first four matches. Attaining opposite records of 4–0–0 and 0–0–4, respectively, New York earned a 2–0 road win at RFK Stadium. The win was New York's first road win against D.C. since October 8, 2005 and their first win against United since 2008, as well as their first shutout against United since 2006. Subsequently, United drew 0–0 against New York in their first meeting in Red Bull Arena allowing the Red Bulls to win the Atlantic Cup derby for the first time since 2003, ending a six-year stretch of titles won by D.C.

The rivalry intensified, mainly between United and Red Bulls supporters in April 2011, when New York visited D.C. At the time, New York had been on a two-game winning streak, and held by far the best Eastern Conference record. United, rebuilding from the prior year were much lower in the standings. Goals from Thierry Henry, Joel Lindpere and Juan Agudelo lead the Red Bulls to a commanding 4–0 victory over United, making it the worst loss United suffered at home since the 2005 MLS Cup Playoffs, and their worst loss ever to New York. However, in the return match, United earned a 1–0 away victory at Red Bull Arena, giving them some consolation over New York, but ultimately failing to win the Atlantic Cup for the second straight year. In spite of winning the Atlantic Cup for two-straight years, making it New York's first time since 2003, players expressed disinterest in the honor.

On June 24, 2012, the two sides clashed again in the second of three legs of the series. The match ended in New York's advantage, earning a 3–2 victory over D.C. Ex-United midfielder Brandon Barklage netted two of the Red Bulls' three goals. United's Chris Pontius scored the fastest goal in franchise history, scoring 29 seconds after kickoff. The announced crowd of 25,187 was the largest in Red Bull Arena history, and the largest crowd to witness the rivalry since 2004.

On January 18, 2022, the LA Galaxy announced that the Red Bulls and D.C. United will participate in the Coachella Valley Invitational.

On April 21, 2022, the teams were drawn together for the Round of 32 in the U.S. Open Cup. The Red Bulls defeated D.C. United 3-0 on May 10, 2022 to advance to the Round of 16, with a first half goal in stoppage time by Luquinhas, and second half goals by John Tolkin and Zach Ryan. After adding up a few more wins, the Red Bulls would eventually fall to Orlando City SC in the Semifinals. 

Despite D.C. United taking advantage of the Red Bulls in the 2000s, New York has seized control of the rivalry in the late 2010s, as well as the early 2020s. The Bulls took the past 5 of 6 season series, cutting D.C. United's Atlantic Cup lead to just 14-13 heading into 2023.

Supporters 

A majority of the Atlantic Cup derby is seen between the supporters groups of D.C. United and the New York Red Bulls. Two of the largest and oldest supporters clubs in Major League Soccer history, originate as supporters of United and Red Bull. The largest supporters groups of D.C. United, La Barra Brava, and the Screaming Eagles, formed in 1995, a year before the inaugural season of the league. Likewise, the first supporters group for New York, the Empire Supporters Club also formed in 1995, making the three fan clubs amongst the oldest in modern-day American soccer, the first version of super-fans seen in American soccer since the late 1970s/early 1980s during the North American Soccer League era.

Over the years, several other supporters groups have sprouted to support D.C. United and the New York Red Bulls. Since 1996, La Norte and the District Ultras formed in support of D.C. United. Likewise the Garden State Ultras, a group of Red Bull fans based in New Jersey, and the Viking Army, named in tribute to former Red Bull coach, Hans Backe and his Scandinavian roots, have formed. La Norte is known for bringing a heavy Latin-American feel to RFK Stadium and its atmosphere, launching toilet paper, banners, and playing various instruments much like club teams in South America. The District Ultras are an ultras fan group that is known for its controversial stances in opposition to the league structure of MLS, and the way the league operates under its single entity structure. Throughout the first few years of existence, the Ultras have been known for very political signs denouncing the franchise set up existing in MLS and promoting a more independent club setup, commonly seen throughout the rest of the World and in the lower divisions of the American soccer pyramid.

Because of the proximities of the New York City and Washington, D.C. metropolitan areas (about 228 miles, or 367 kilometers) matches between the two clubs have high levels of away supporters, average in the thousands for matches.

Players and transfers

D.C., then New York

New York, then D.C.

Honors

With 13 major honors, D.C. United have won more major competitions than any other Major League Soccer club, and are tied for the most of any North American soccer franchise ever. D.C. United won their first major title in 1996, winning the 1996 MLS Cup championship. Since then, they have claimed three additional MLS Cups (league championship), four Supporters' Shields (league premiership), three U.S. Open Cups (national championship) and one CONCACAF Champions Cup title (continental championship). In addition, United won the 1998 Copa Interamericana, an infrequently-held and now-defunct super cup between the champions of CONCACAF and CONMEBOL. Of the original MLS franchises, New York was the last to have won its first major honor, capturing their first Supporters' Shield in 2013.

Table correct as of October 28, 2018

All-time game results 
The largest victory in the history between these sides was a 5–0 victory by D.C. United over the New York MetroStars at Giants Stadium. The match was played on September 16, 1998. The match remains United's largest away victory against New York in history. New York's largest victory came on April 21, 2011 when the Red Bulls posted a 4–0 victory over United. The largest crowd on hand to witness the Atlantic Cup was on April 17, 2004 when 72,312 witnessed New York post a 3–2 victory over D.C. United.

Statistics 
As of August 6, 2022, there have been a total of 103 competitive games between D.C. United and the New York Red Bulls. D.C. has won 46 of these outings, while New York has won 38. The remaining 19 matches ended as draws.

Eastern Conference standings finishes

• Total: New York with 15 higher finishes, D.C. United with 12.

Winners by year

See also 
 MLS rivalry cups
 I-95 derbies
 Commanders–Giants rivalry
 Capitals–Rangers rivalry

Notes

References

D.C. United
New York Red Bulls
Major League Soccer rivalries
Soccer cup competitions in the United States